Lee Min-hyuk is the name of:

 Lee Min-hyuk (rapper, born November 1990), South Korean singer, member of boy band BtoB
 Lee Min-hyuk (singer, born December 1990), South Korean singer, member of boy band Block B
 Lee Min-hyuk (singer, born 1993), South Korean singer, member of boy band Monsta X